Logan Laurice Browning (born June 9, 1989) is an American actress. She is best known for starring as Samantha White in the 2017 Netflix satirical-drama series Dear White People. She is also known for playing Sasha in the 2007 film Bratz: The Movie, Brianna Ortiz in Meet the Browns, Jelena Howard on the VH1 series Hit the Floor, and Zora in the PlayStation Network series Powers.

Early life
Browning was born in Atlanta, Georgia. She is biracial, born to a white birth mother and an African American birth father. Her adoptive parents are African American. Growing up, she did a lot of activities, from dancing for a local ballet company to cheerleading in junior high. She attended Vanderbilt University in Nashville, Tennessee.

Career 

In 2003, She studied acting from a young age by taking classes at Barbizon Modeling and Acting School in Atlanta. She made her acting debut in the teen series Summerland as the character Carrie, and played Vanessa in the Nickelodeon series Ned's Declassified School Survival Guide in 2005–06. She also appeared as the main love interest in Dijon Talton's video for the song "Wild Out".

In 2007, Browning starred as one of the main characters, Sasha, in the live-action theatrical feature Bratz: The Movie, based on the popular fashion doll line.

Browning joined the cast of Meet the Browns during the second season, replacing Brianne Gould as the character Brianna Ortiz. She makes a brief appearance in Prima J's "Rockstar" music video, as well as B5's music video "U Got Me". Browning had a recurring role on the Disney XD series Pair of Kings.

She appeared in two episodes of The Secret Circle, a TV series based on the novels of the same name by L.J. Smith. In April 2012, Browning was cast as Jelena Howard in VH1's Hit the Floor. Before "Hit the Floor", Browning was not a professional dancer. She was cast for her acting ability and trained for 8 months before the series filming.

Browning starred alongside her Hit the Floor co-star, Katherine Bailess, in the YouTube comedic series Shit Southern Women Say. In July 2016, it was announced that Browning would star in the role of Samantha White in the Netflix satirical-drama series Dear White People. In 2017, Browning was cast in the role of Lizzie on the Netflix horror film, The Perfection. The film was released on May 24, 2019.

Filmography

References

External links
 
  Logan Browning as Jelena Howard on VH1's Hit the Floor (TV series)

1989 births
21st-century American actresses
American television actresses
African-American actresses
American child actresses
American film actresses
African-American female dancers
American female dancers
Living people
Actresses from Atlanta
American adoptees
Vanderbilt University alumni